Jean Ankeney (March 29, 1922 – May 14, 2005) was an American politician, teacher, and public health nurse.

Born in Fuzhou, China, to American missionaries, Ankeney grew up in Williamstown, Massachusetts. She received her bachelor's degree from Hiram College and her master's degree from Case Western Reserve University. Ankeney was a teacher and public health nurse. In 1975, Ankeney moved to Vermont and lived in St. George, Vermont. From 1993 to 2002, Ankeney served in the Vermont State Senate and was a Democrat. Ankeney died at her home in St. George, Vermont of a rare form of lung cancer.

Notes

1922 births
2005 deaths
People from Williamstown, Massachusetts
People from St. George, Vermont
Hiram College alumni
Case Western Reserve University alumni
Educators from Vermont
American women educators
Women state legislators in Vermont
Democratic Party Vermont state senators
20th-century American politicians
20th-century American women politicians
American expatriates in China
21st-century American women